The Roman Catholic Diocese of Umzimkulu is a diocese centered  at the city of Harding in the Ecclesiastical province of Durban in South Africa.  It comprises 15 parishes, each with 5-14 outstations - chapels served by missionaries.

History
 February 21, 1954: Established as Diocese of Umzimkulu from the Diocese of Mariannhill

Special churches
The Cathedral is the Cathedral of Our Lady of Lourdes in Harding.

Leadership
 Bishop Pius Bonaventura Dlamini, FFJ (1954.02.21 – 1967.12.14)
 Fr. Peter Fanyana John Butelezi, OMI (1968 - 1972.07.30) Apostolic Administrator
 Archbishop Denis Eugene Hurley, OMI (1972 - 1986) Apostolic Administrator
 Bishop Gerard Sithunywa Ndlovu (1986.12.22 – 1994.08.22)
 Archbishop Wilfrid Fox Napier, OFM (Cardinal in 2001) (1994.08.22 - 2008.12.31) Apostolic Administrator
 Bishop , O.S.P.P.E. (since 2008.12.31)

See also
Roman Catholicism in South Africa

References

External links
 GCatholic.org 
 Catholic Hierarchy 

Umzimkulu
Christian organizations established in 1954
Roman Catholic dioceses and prelatures established in the 20th century
KwaZulu-Natal
Roman Catholic Ecclesiastical Province of Durban